Kauaeranga Valley is a valley created by the Kauaeranga River, which flows from the Coromandel Range southwest to the Firth of Thames at Thames, New Zealand in the  North Island. It contains the settlement of Kauaeranga on the Coromandel Peninsula. It is located near Thames, in the Thames-Coromandel District in the Waikato region. It covers a land area of 180.51 km2.

Kauaeranga Valley Road is the only significant road in the valley.

History
The local iwi, Ngāti Maru, called the area Waiwhakauaeranga ("waters of the stacked jaw bones") in memory of a battle after which they piled the jaw bones of their enemies on the side of the river.

The valley was a rich source of kauri timber, and numerous dams and several tramlines were built to facilitate harvesting in the late 19th and early 20th centuries. The last big removal of timber from the Kauraeranga Valley started with the Kauri Timber Company building a  tramway up the valley from the Parawai booms in 1915. Later they extended the line to a dump at the Waihou river below Kopu. All bush operations were finished by January 1928, and the line was lifted. Over 40 million feet of timber was carried over this line. Parts of driving dams, Webb Creek staircase, a log hauling skid road, the Parawai Boom and the Billy Goat incline remain.

In some parts of the valley, farms were established with five lots made available in 1880. Lack of roads and severe weather made farming difficult, so land was allowed to revert to bush. There was little farmed land left by the late 1960s.

Residents first requested that the Auckland Education Board establish a school in the valley in 1896, but the Kauaeranga Valley School did not open until 1903. The initial roll was 30 students. By 1946, with the road to Thames having improved and many children going to school there, the roll had fallen to seven, and the school closed.

A post and telegraph office opened in 1903 The Post Office closed in 1953, with rural delivery taking its place. A telephone office operated from the closure of the post office until 1955, when an automatic exchange would have rendered it uneccessary.

The Kauaeranga Valley Dairy Company opened a factory in November 1907 to produce milk and butter. It closed in September 1908 and moved to Parawai, where it was defunct by 1910.

A road between Thames and Tairua was proposed in 1909, with the recommended route going through the Kauaeranga Valley, up the Piraunui Valley, across the Hihi saddle, and down the third branch of Tairua River. In 1926, a track was created over this route, and the following year, 100 men started work to convert it to a road, but the work was abandoned later that year. After the Second World War, a route further south along the Kirikiri Stream gained favour, and the road which is now  was built from 1961, opening to traffic in March 1967.

From 1957, an electric power line was built from Thames, through the Kauaeranga Valley and north to Coroglen. This was complete by 1959.

Coromandel Forest Park was established in 1970 to provide protection for the remaining native forest, and took over the remaining farmland.

Demographics

Kauaeranga had a population of 588 at the 2018 New Zealand census, an increase of 24 people (4.3%) since the 2013 census, and an increase of 57 people (10.7%) since the 2006 census. There were 207 households, comprising 294 males and 291 females, giving a sex ratio of 1.01 males per female. The median age was 48.6 years (compared with 37.4 years nationally), with 102 people (17.3%) aged under 15 years, 72 (12.2%) aged 15 to 29, 285 (48.5%) aged 30 to 64, and 129 (21.9%) aged 65 or older.

Ethnicities were 88.3% European/Pākehā, 18.9% Māori, 1.0% Pacific peoples, 1.0% Asian, and 2.0% other ethnicities. People may identify with more than one ethnicity.

The percentage of people born overseas was 15.3, compared with 27.1% nationally.

Although some people chose not to answer the census's question about religious affiliation, 62.2% had no religion, 26.5% were Christian, 1.0% had Māori religious beliefs, 0.5% were Hindu, 1.0% were Buddhist and 1.5% had other religions.

Of those at least 15 years old, 105 (21.6%) people had a bachelor's or higher degree, and 87 (17.9%) people had no formal qualifications. The median income was $28,900, compared with $31,800 nationally. 78 people (16.0%) earned over $70,000 compared to 17.2% nationally. The employment status of those at least 15 was that 222 (45.7%) people were employed full-time, 96 (19.8%) were part-time, and 15 (3.1%) were unemployed.

Economy
In 2018, 13.2% of the workforce worked in healthcare, 10.4% worked in construction, 9.4% of the workforce worked in primary industries, 9.4% worked in manufacturing, 9.4% worked in education, 4.7% worked in transport and 3.8% worked in hospitality.

Tourism

Kauaeranga Visitor Centre is an information centre run by the Department of Conservation. It accepts payment for camping at the numerous campsites further along the road, and organises accommodation at two cottages next to the centre. The road is sealed to this point, and gravel for the remaining . Short walks, day tramps and multi-day tramps start from the road beyond the centre.

The return tramp takes eight hours and is often done over two days.

Pinnacles Hut with 80 bunks and Crosbies Hut with 10 bunks provide basic overnight accommodation for the multi-day tramps.

Transportation
As of 2018, among those who commute to work, 67.9% drove a car, 0.9% rode in a car, 1.9% used a bike, and 1.9% walked or ran.

References

Further reading

Thames-Coromandel District
Valleys of New Zealand
Landforms of Waikato